Pattampoochi is an 2022 Indian Tamil-language period psychological action thriller film written and directed by Badri, produced by Khushbu Sundar, under the banner of Avni Cinemax. The film stars Sundar C. and Jai in the lead roles, alongside Honey Rose, Imman Annachi and Manasvi Kottachi. The film was released on 24 June 2022, to mixed reviews from critics and audience, with criticism for the violence and the writing but Jai's performance received praise. Despite this, he performed well at the box-office.

Synopsis
The film is a violent cat and mouse game between Inspector Kumaran (Sundar. C) who suffers from PTSD and Sudhakar (Jai) an ultra violent serial killer. Who will win in this battle ?

Cast

Production
The project was announced in December 2020, with Sundar C. revealing that he would work with Badri on a film, where Jai would portray the antagonist. The film was shot at regular intervals throughout 2021, with several scenes shot in Pondicherry.

Release
The Satellite And Digital Rights of the Film were brought by Kalaignar TV.

Reception
The film was released on 24 June 2022. A critic from Times of India called it a "a loud, violent serial killer film", while The Hindu noted it was "a silly psycho-thriller that banks majorly on shock value". The New Indian Express stated it was "a gore-fest that loses fizz". A critic from Dina Thanthi stated that " Sundar C as a police officer. perfect Majestic in the fight scenes as if he had earned the title of a man. Throws Jai away easily. The scenes where he chases Jai, make you sit on the edge of your seat." Dinamalar critic gave 2.75 rating out of 5

References

External links

2022 films
2022 crime thriller films
Indian crime thriller films
2020s Tamil-language films
Films directed by Badri